This is a List of clubs in the Verbandsliga Südbaden, including all clubs and their final placings from the inaugural 1978–79 season to the current one. The league is the highest football league in the South Baden region of Baden-Württemberg. It is one of 35 leagues at the sixth tier of the German football league system. Until the introduction of the 3. Liga in 2008 it was the fifth tier of the league system, until the introduction of the Regionalligas in 1994 the fourth tier.

Overview
The league was formed in 1978 to replace the league that existed in its place until then, the Amateurliga Südbaden, as the third tier in Baden-Württemberg. At the same time, the Amateur-Oberliga Baden-Württemberg was formed above it.

League timeline
The league went through the following timeline of name changes, format and position in the league system:

League placings
The complete list of clubs in the league and their league placings.

1978–1994
The complete list of clubs and placings in the league while operating as a tier four league from 1978 to 1994:

1994–present
The complete list of clubs and placings in the league while operating as the tier five (1994–2008) and six (2008–present) league:

Key

 S = No of seasons in league (as of 2022–23)

References

External links 
  Das deutsche Fußball-Archiv Historic German league tables
  Fussball.de: Verbandsliga Südbaden
  SBFV: South Baden Football Association

Football competitions in Baden-Württemberg
Sudbaden